Rezo Davidovich Gavtadze (born 11 July 1995) is a Georgian professional football player who plays as a left midfielder. He also holds Russian citizenship.

Club career
He made his professional debut on 19 March 2016 for FC Ural Sverdlovsk Oblast in a Russian Football Premier League game against FC Terek Grozny.

References

External links
 
 

1995 births
People from Imereti
Russian people of Georgian descent
Living people
Footballers from Georgia (country)
Russian footballers
Association football midfielders
FC Ural Yekaterinburg players
FC Chikhura Sachkhere players
FC TSK Simferopol players
Russian Premier League players
Russian Second League players
Erovnuli Liga players